Mystacina is the sole surviving genus of the family Mystacinidae. The New Zealand lesser short-tailed bat is the only member of this group confirmed to survive today, since the closely related New Zealand greater short-tailed bat possibly went extinct as recently as 1965. A third species, Mystacina miocenalis, is known from the Middle Miocene some 19-16 million years ago.

References

Bat genera
Mammal genera with one living species
Taxa named by John Edward Gray
Mystacinidae
Mammals of New Zealand
Endemic fauna of New Zealand
Endemic mammals of New Zealand